Business and Pleasure is a 1932 American pre-Code comedy film directed by David Butler, starring Will Rogers and featuring Boris Karloff.

Plot
Earl Tinker (Will Rogers) goes on a Mediterranean cruise and finds that a business rival has a femme fatale in pursuit.

Cast
 Will Rogers as Earl Tinker
 Jetta Goudal as Madame Momora
 Joel McCrea as Lawrence Ogle
 Dorothy Peterson as Mrs. Tinker
 Oscar Apfel as P.D. Weatheright
 Vernon Dent as Charles Turner
 Boris Karloff as Sheik
 Mitchell Lewis as Hadj Ali
 Jed Prouty as Ben Wackstle
 Cyril Ring as Arthur Jones
 Peggy Ross as Olivia Tinker

See also
 List of American films of 1932
 Boris Karloff filmography

References

External links

1932 films
1932 comedy films
1930s English-language films
American comedy films
American black-and-white films
Films directed by David Butler
Films based on works by Booth Tarkington
Fox Film films
1930s American films